Omar Cherif Belbey (born 7 October 1973) is an Algerian former professional footballer who played as a midfielder. At international level, he represented Algeria participating at the 2002 African Cup of Nations in Mali.

In the final of the 1996 Coupe de France against AJ Auxerre, Belbey scored a goal for Nîmes Olympique.

Honours
Nîmes
 Coupe de France runner-up: 1996 Coupe de France
 Championnat National: 1997

References

Living people
1973 births
Footballers from Rouen
Association football midfielders
Algeria international footballers
French sportspeople of Algerian descent
Algerian footballers
French footballers
Ligue 1 players
Ligue 2 players
FC Rouen players
Montpellier HSC players
Nîmes Olympique players
2002 African Cup of Nations players
Wasquehal Football players